The Spoilers is a 1942 American Western film directed by Ray Enright and starring Marlene Dietrich, Randolph Scott and John Wayne.

The Spoilers was adapted to screen by Lawrence Hazard from the 1906 Rex Beach novel of the same name. Film versions also appeared in 1914, 1923 (with Noah Beery Sr. as McNamara and Anna Q. Nilsson as Malotte), 1930 (with Gary Cooper as Glennister and Betty Compson as Malotte; this is the only time that Gary Cooper and John Wayne played the same role in two different films), and 1955 (with Anne Baxter as Malotte, Jeff Chandler as Glennister, and Rory Calhoun as McNamara).

Marlene Dietrich, Randolph Scott, and John Wayne also appeared together that same year in a movie called Pittsburgh. Scott was billed above Wayne in both movies, even though Wayne's role was larger and more important in each, because he was under contract to Universal, whereas Wayne was borrowed from Republic. Dietrich and Wayne had also made the earlier film Seven Sinners together in 1940.

Bestselling poet Robert W. Service (not credited) plays The Poet, a fictionalized version of himself.

The film was nominated for an Oscar for Best Art Direction (John B. Goodman, Jack Otterson, Russell A. Gausman and Edward Ray Robinson).

Plot
Nome, Alaska, 1900: Flapjack and Banty come to town to check on their gold mine claim. Saloon owner Cherry Malotte is aware of the corruption all around, including that Bennett and Clark are out to steal the men's claim.

In on the crooked scheme is the new gold commissioner, Alexander McNamara, as well as the last word of law and order in the territory, Judge Stillman. So, the bad guys usually get their way.

Cherry's old beau, Roy Glennister, returns from a trip to Europe. He is attracted to Helen Chester, the judge's niece. Roy makes the mistake of siding with McNamara, damaging his relationship with his longtime partner, Al Dextry.

Roy realizes he's been deceived as McNamara and Stillman prepare to steal at least $250,000 while the mine's case awaits appeal. Helen is now in love with Roy, who begs Dextry's forgiveness and persuades him to rob a bank to take back the wealth stolen from them.
Both Glennister and Dextry don blackface to disguise themselves.

The Bronco Kid kills the marshall, but Roy gets the blame. He is arrested and a plot forms to kill him, but Cherry comes to his rescue by breaking Roy out of jail. A fierce fistfight with McNamara results in Roy getting back his mine and his girl.

Cast

 Marlene Dietrich as Cherry Malotte
 Randolph Scott as Alex McNamara
 John Wayne as Roy Glennister
 Margaret Lindsay as Helen Chester
 Harry Carey Al Dextry
 Richard Barthelmess as Bronco Kid Farrow
 George Cleveland as Banty
 Samuel S. Hinds as Judge Stillman
 Russell Simpson as Flapjack Sims
 William Farnum as Wheaton
 Marietta Canty as Idabelle
 Jack Norton as Mr. Skinner
 Bennett Ray Bennett as Clark
 Forrest Taylor as Bennett
 Miles Art Miles as Deputy
 Charles McMurphy as Deputy
 Charles Halton as Stuve
 Bud Osborne as Marshall 
 Drew Demorest as Galloway

See also
 Marlene Dietrich filmography
 Randolph Scott filmography
 John Wayne filmography
 Seven Sinners (1940 film), with Marlene Dietrich and John Wayne
Pittsburgh (1942 film), with Marlene Dietrich, Randolph Scott, and John Wayne

References

External links
 
 
 
 

1942 films
1942 Western (genre) films
American Western (genre) films
1940s English-language films
American black-and-white films
Films based on Western (genre) novels
Films based on American novels
Films set in 1898
Films set in Alaska
Northern (genre) films
Universal Pictures films
Films directed by Ray Enright
Films based on The Spoilers (Beach novel)
Films scored by Hans J. Salter
Remakes of American films
Films shot in California
Films shot in Yukon
1940s American films